Shane Aaron Peterson (born February 11, 1988) is an American former professional baseball outfielder. He has played in Major League Baseball (MLB) for the Oakland Athletics, Milwaukee Brewers, and Tampa Bay Rays.

Career

Amateur
Peterson attended California State University, Long Beach, and in 2007 he played collegiate summer baseball with the Hyannis Mets of the Cape Cod Baseball League where he was named a league all-star. He was selected by the St. Louis Cardinals in the 2nd round of the 2008 MLB Draft.

Oakland Athletics
Peterson was traded from the Cardinals to the Oakland Athletics for Matt Holliday on July 24, 2009.

He was added to the 40-man roster on November 20, 2012.

Chicago Cubs
He was claimed off waivers by the Chicago Cubs on December 19, 2014.

Milwaukee Brewers
On December 23, 2014, Peterson was claimed off waivers by the Milwaukee Brewers. The Brewers designated Peterson for assignment on January 29, 2016. He was sent outright to the Colorado Springs Sky Sox, the Brewers AAA affiliate, on February 4, 2016. He was invited to the Brewers' Spring Training camp in mid-February to compete for the lone outfield position still open, and was one of nine players competing to be the Brewers center fielder for the 2016 season.

Tampa Bay Rays
On December 19, 2016, Peterson signed a minor league contract with the Tampa Bay Rays. On April 14, 2017 he was called up to play an away game against the Boston Red Sox where he hit a 2-run home run in his first at-bat as a member of the Rays. On July 28, Peterson was designated for assignment by the Rays.

San Diego Padres
Peterson signed a minor league contract with the San Diego Padres on December 21. He elected free agency on November 2, 2018.

Los Angeles Dodgers
On December 30, 2018, Peterson signed a minor league deal with the Los Angeles Dodgers. Peterson elected free agency after the season on November 4, 2019.

References

External links

1988 births
Living people
Sportspeople from Temecula, California
People from Fallbrook, California
Baseball players from California
Major League Baseball outfielders
Oakland Athletics players
Milwaukee Brewers players
Tampa Bay Rays players
Long Beach State Dirtbags baseball players
Hyannis Harbor Hawks players
Batavia Muckdogs players
Palm Beach Cardinals players
Springfield Cardinals players
Midland RockHounds players
Sacramento River Cats players
Estrellas Orientales players
American expatriate baseball players in the Dominican Republic
Colorado Springs Sky Sox players
Águilas de Mexicali players
American expatriate baseball players in Mexico
Durham Bulls players
El Paso Chihuahuas players
Oklahoma City Dodgers players